is a Japanese music manga written and illustrated by Chiho Saito. It was serialised by Shogakukan in Amici from 1995 to 1997 and collected in six bound volumes. Kanon received the 1997 Shogakukan Manga Award for shōjo manga. The manga is licensed for a French-language release in France by Star Comics.

Plot
Budding composer Tendou Kawahara flees to Mongolia after being belittled by renowned composer Gen Mikami. In Mongolia, Tendou meets Kanon, a Japanese girl who has a talent for playing the violin. After her mother's untimely death, Kanon moves to Japan with Tendou in search of her father. Tendou attempts to bring out Kanon's talent without success. Soon after, Kanon's aunt gives Kanon 3 pictures of her possible father. One of them dies of a heart attack soon after, another is homosexual and a third, Kent Gregory, lives in the United States and has been gravely ill for a long time.

Ultimately, Kanon goes to the United States, only to find Kent on his deathbed. Following his funeral, she returns to Japan. There an unusual twist is discovered; none of the three people Kanon sought is her father. However, Gen Mikami decides he wants Kanon as one of his musicians. After losing in a challenge to Mikami, Tendou enrolls Kanon in a music school where Mikami is the manager. There, Kanon falls in love with Mikami, only to learn that he is her father.

Manga
Written and illustrated by Chiho Saito, Kanon was serialised by Shogakukan in the shōjo manga magazine Amici from 1995 to 1997. The serial chapters were collected in six tankōbon volumes under the Flower Comics imprint. In 2003, Flower Comics re-released the manga in the three bunkobon volumes.

References

External links 

1995 manga
Chiho Saito
Music in anime and manga
Shōjo manga
Shogakukan manga
Winners of the Shogakukan Manga Award for shōjo manga
Incest in anime and manga